Located Glenwood in Howard County, Maryland, United States, Ellerslie Plantation.

The Elerslie slave plantation was built on the lands of Captain Thomas Hobbs given to his daughter Amelia. Jasper and Amelia Peddicord built a house (later side-by-side) around a log hunting lodge built about 1763. These were built on portion of land patented as "Ridgley's Great Range''. In 1830, Richard Snowden purchased the land for a wedding present. In 1835, Nicholas Snowden of Montpeiler married Elizabeth Ridgley Warfield. Richard and his sons left to pursue the California Gold Rush. The House was purchased in 1845 by Basil Crapster who expanded the house to an unusual mirrored layout with a duplicate addition on the Western Portion. In 1945 Jaessie Hakes and his wife purchased the manor and 132 acres of surrounding land plus adjoining properties which have been subdivided for residential construction.

The manor is a two and one-half story house with stone construction. Outbuildings include a stone spring house and wood barn built in the late 1700s.

See also
List of Howard County properties in the Maryland Historical Trust
Round About Hills
Bushy Park, Glenwood Maryland
Carr's Mill Landfill

References

Houses in Howard County, Maryland
Glenwood, Howard County, Maryland
Plantations in Maryland
1760s establishments in Maryland
Houses completed in 1763